This article presents a timeline of events in British history from 1000 AD until 1499 AD.

12th century

 1135 Death of Henry I, accession of King Stephen to English throne
 1137 Beginning of a civil war between King Stephen and the Empress Matilda over the succession to the English throne; accession of Owain Gwynedd, the first Welsh ruler to style himself prince of Wales 
 1154 Death of King Stephen, accession of Henry II to English throne
 1164 Constitutions of Clarendon, a set of laws which governs the trial of members of the Church in England
 1170 Assassination of Thomas Becket; death of Owain Gwynedd, prince of Wales
 1189 Death of Henry II, Richard I accedes to the English throne.
 1192 Richard is captured by Duke Leopold of Austria whilst returning from the Crusades
 1194 Richard is ransomed and returns to England; accession of Llywelyn ab Iorwerth to the throne of Gwynedd
 1199 Death of Richard I, King John accedes to the English throne

13th century

1209 King John excommunicated by Pope Innocent III
1212 Great Fire of 1212, London
1215 The Magna Carta is agreed by King John at Runnymede
1216 Death of King John, Henry III succeeds to the throne of England
1237 Border between Scotland and England by the Treaty of York
1240 Death of Llywelyn ab Iorwerth, prince of Wales; Dafydd ap Llywelyn succeeds to the throne of Gwynedd
1246 Death of Dafydd ap Llywelyn; Llywelyn ap Gruffudd succeeds to the throne of Gwynedd (he does not claim the title of prince of Wales until 1258)
1249 Death of Alexander II, king of Scots; Alexander III succeeds to the throne of Scotland
1263 Battle of Largs, an inconclusive battle fought between Haakon IV of Norway and the Scots
1264 Simon de Montfort leads rebel English barons to defeat Henry III at the Battle of Lewes
1266 Scotland and Norway sign the Treaty of Perth under which Scottish control of the Western Isles is acknowledged
1267 Henry III of England recognises the authority of Llywelyn ap Gruffudd in Wales
1272 Death of Henry III, Edward I succeeds to the English throne
1277 England annexes Wales, a state of affairs which lasted until 1283
1279 Statute of Mortmain
1282 Death of Llywelyn ap Gruffudd, prince of Wales; Dafydd ap Gruffudd succeeds to the throne of Gwynedd
1283 Death of Dafydd ap Gruffudd; English conquest of Wales
1287 Revolt of Rhys ap Maredudd in Wales
1294 Revolt of Madog ap Llywelyn in Wales
1297 William Wallace and the Scots defeat the English at the Battle of Stirling Bridge

14th century

 1305 Capture and execution of Scottish resistance fighter William Wallace by the English on a charge of treason
 1306 Robert the Bruce kills John Comyn III of Badenoch and is crowned King of Scotland 
 1307 Death of Edward I, Edward II accedes to the English throne
 1314 Decisive victory for Scotland over England at the Battle of Bannockburn
 1316 Revolt of Llywelyn Bren in south Wales
 1322 Edward II defeats a rebellious baronial faction at Battle of Boroughbridge
 1327 Edward III usurps the English throne in January, Edward II is killed in September
 1328 England recognises Scotland's independence in the Treaty of Edinburgh–Northampton
 1338 Edward III claims the throne of France, initiating the Hundred Years' War
 1348 The Black Death first arrives in England and ultimately kills c. one third of the population
 1356 Battle of Poitiers
 1377 Death of Edward III, his grandson Richard II accedes to the English throne
 1381 Peasants' Revolt of 1381
 1392 Statute of Praemunire
 1399 Henry Bolingbroke usurps the English throne becoming Henry IV

15th century

 1413 – Henry IV dies and is succeeded by his son, Henry V
 1415 – Henry V is welcomed back to England after a major victory at the Battle of Agincourt, France
 1422 – Henry V dies and is succeeded by his son, Henry VI 
 1471 – Henry VI is murdered and Edward IV is restored to the English throne
 1483 – Death of Edward IV of England, Edward V accedes to the throne
 1485 – The Battle of Bosworth Field on 22 August ends the Yorkist reign of Richard III and ushers in Tudor reign, with the reign of Henry VII
 1487 – The Battle of Stoke is fought between Henry VII and Lambert Simnel a Yorkist claimant to the throne. It is the last battle of the Wars of the Roses

See also
 Timeline of British history
 History of England
 History of Ireland
 History of Northern Ireland
 History of Scotland
 History of Wales
 History of the British Isles
 Britain in the Middle Ages

External links
Timeline 1400–1499 from Timeref.com
Timeline 1300–1399 from Timeref.com
Timeline 1200–1299 from Timeref.com
Timeline 1100–1199 from Timeref.com
Timeline 1000–1099 from Timeref.com

British history timelines